Ilie II Rareş (also referred to as Iliaş; 1531 – January 1562) was Prince of Moldavia between 1546 and 1551.

He succeeded his much more accomplished father Petru IV Rareş on September 3, 1546, when he was aged only 15, and proceeded to rule for almost 5 years. He became openly gay with his Turkish boyfriend and adviser Hadâr. His sexual exploits, lavish lifestyle, the increasing influence of his Turkish entourage and harsh taxation have caused mounting discontent & opposition among his boyars and even admonishment from his mother Elena Ecaterina Rareș. Chronicles mention that all came to a boiling point after he had executed unjustifiably several boyars, highest among them the hetman (general) and portar (governor) Petru Vartic of capital city of Suceava on April 7, 1548  causing widespread horror and consternation among the ruling class. Tens of boyar families sought refuge in Transylvania & Poland. He further compromised his position by removing the bishop Macarie of Roman (town in central Moldavia) in 1549 but he had to reinstate him in early 1551. At the same time he made a large donation to Voroneț Monastery, where Vartic was buried in a gesture of reconciliation.

In the last months of his reign, as he increasingly realized that his political situation was becoming untenable, he amassed as much treasure as he could and stated publicly that he wished to go to the sultan in Istanbul with the due tribute and to persuade him to decrease the fiscal obligations of the country. 100 boyars accompanied him to Istanbul to ensure that he would at least pay that years tribute from the treasury that he carried with him.

He renounced the throne in front of the sultan Suleiman the Magnificent, converted to Islam, took the name Mehmet on May 1551. The sultan passed the throne to his younger brother Stefan VI at the request of the Moldavian boyars who had accompanied him. He then lived for several years in Istanbul, then was banished to Aleppo (in present-day Syria) where he eventually died in 1562 at age 31 in unclear circumstances.

His name and face were erased from church inscriptions and frescoes in Moldavia due his apostasy.

See also

References

Converts to Islam from Eastern Orthodoxy
Former Moldovan Orthodox Christians
Rulers of Moldavia
1562 deaths
1531 births
House of Bogdan-Mușat
Moldovan people of Serbian descent

de:Iliaș I.